Enrique Díaz (born 27 April 1957) is a Puerto Rican sailor. He competed in the Tornado event at the 1984 Summer Olympics.

References

External links
 

1957 births
Living people
Puerto Rican male sailors (sport)
Olympic sailors of Puerto Rico
Sailors at the 1984 Summer Olympics – Tornado
Place of birth missing (living people)